George Tupou V (Tongan: Siaosi Tupou, full name: Siaosi Tāufaʻāhau Manumataongo Tukuʻaho Tupou; 4 May 194818 March 2012) was the King of Tonga from the death of his father Tāufaʻāhau Tupou IV in 2006 until his own death six years later.

Early life and education 
Prince Siaosi was born on 4 May 1948, as the eldest child of Crown Prince Tupoutoʻa-Tungī of Tonga (son of Queen Sālote Tupou III and Prince Viliami) and his wife Crown Princess Halaevalu.

Tupou V attended King's School and King's College, both in Auckland. This was followed by periods at The Leys School in Cambridge, and another school in Switzerland. He also studied at Oxford University and the Royal Military Academy Sandhurst in England.

Crown Prince 
Tupou V was appointed Crown Prince on 4 May 1966. In that role, he was better known by one of his traditional chiefly titles, 'Tupoutoʻa.

In 1974, though unmarried, Tupou V had a daughter, 'Ilima Lei Fifita Tohi. In 1997 she married police officer Tulutulumafua i'Olotele Kalaniuvalu and has three children. According to the Constitution of Tonga, ʻIlima is ineligible to accede to the throne as only children born of a royal marriage may succeed.

As Crown Prince, Tupoutoʻa held great influence in Tongan politics, and was Minister of Foreign Affairs from 1979 to 1998. He had substantial business interests in Tonga and abroad, and was co-chairman of the Shoreline Group/Tonfön.

Reign 

The King was recognised as a descendant of the sky god Tangaroa. He was sworn in as King Tupou V on 11 September 2006, which also made him, from a traditional viewpoint, the 23rd Tuʻi Kanokupolu (the overlords of Tongatapu).

Coronation 
The ceremonial aspects of Tupou V's accession took place in July and August 2008. These were initially to be held in 2007 after the six-month official mourning period for his father (as required of close relatives) and his own birthday. They were also deferred after the 2006 Tonga riots as he decided to focus instead on reconstruction of the damaged capital.

During the week of celebrations, two key ceremonies took place to mark Tupou V's coronation. On 30 July 2008, a Taumafa Kava (Royal Kava Ring ceremony) was held on Malaʻe Pangai, the open space to the east of the Royal Palace. During the ceremony, Tupou V sat on a pile of handwoven pandanus mats in an open pavilion facing the sea, while more than 200 Tongan nobles and chiefs dressed in woven skirts and sea shells circled him. He wore the traditional Tongan ta'ovala (woven mat skirt) and a garland of flowers. During this ceremony, Tupou V was formally recognised as the Tuʻi Kanokupolu, and the rightful descendant of King George Tupou I, who united Tonga in the 19th century. The ceremony involved having kava, hundreds of baskets of food, and seventy cooked pigs presented to the King and the assembly of chiefs and nobles.

Later that night, schoolchildren held 30,000 torches to proclaim the coronation in what is known as a tupakapakanava. The traditional torch spectacle was held at a spot overlooking the Pacific and is an ancient honour reserved solely for the Tongan sovereign and Royal Family.

A second, European-style coronation ceremony took place on 1 August 2008 in the Centennial Chapel, Nuku’alofa. Anglican Archbishop of Polynesia Jabez Bryce invested George Tupou V with the Tongan regalia: the ring, sceptre and sword. During the culmination of the ceremony, Archbishop Bryce placed the Tongan Crown on the monarch's head. Royalty and nobility from around the world were in attendance.

Relinquishing most authority 
A documentary dated June 2004 by Australian journalist Gillian Bradford identifies some of the challenges facing Tongan society, but also shows that King George was in favour of a gradual transition to more extensive democracy in Tonga. In the interview, the then-Crown Prince points out that free speech in Tonga was protected by the Constitution.

Three days before his coronation on 1 August 2008, the King announced that he would relinquish most of his power and be guided by his Prime Minister's recommendations on most matters. The Prime Minister would also be in charge of day-to-day affairs. 

In addition, the King announced that there would be parliamentary reform and elections in 2010. Fielakepa, the spokesman for the royal palace, said, "The Sovereign of the only Polynesian kingdom ... is voluntarily surrendering his powers to meet the democratic aspirations of many of his people ... [The people] favour a more representative, elected Parliament. The king agrees with them."

In July 2010, the government published a new electoral roll and called Tonga's 101,900 citizens to add their names to the document so that they can take part in the historic vote, which was due to be held on 25 November. He would remain head of state, but lose his executive powers, including the ability to appoint the prime minister and ministers. However, it seemed certain that the Monarch would continue to appoint and administer the Judiciary of Tonga for the purposes of assuring that political independence and neutrality were retained. Tupou V also retained the power to commute prison sentences.

Divesting business interests
As king, his first proclamation was that he would dispose of all his business assets as soon as reasonably possible, and in accordance with the law. Tonfön was sold in 2007, but efforts to divest from Shoreline Power were delayed after New Zealand investors withdrew following the 2006 Nuku‘alofa riots.

Other
On 24 February 2012, he visited Pope Benedict XVI in Vatican City.

During his reign, George Tupou V oversaw reforms within the Tongan honours system which both expanded the number of Orders in the Kingdom and created rules to make the award of these Orders more egalitarian.

In 2008 he bestowed noble titles to family members. Most significantly he restored the 'Prince' title to his nephew Prince Tungi, who is the eldest son of Prince Fatafehi 'Alaivahamama'o Tuku'aho.

Illness and death 

In September 2011, Tupou V had surgery to remove a kidney following the discovery of a tumour.

On 15 September 2011, he received the Grand Cross of the Order of Merit of the Republic of Hungary from Pál Schmitt, the president of Hungary. During his time as Minister of Foreign Affairs, he had been made an officer of France's Legion of Honour.

Matangi Tonga reported that George Tupou V died in HKT on 18 March 2012 at Queen Mary Hospital in Pok Fu Lam, Hong Kong, though governing institutions in Tonga did not immediately confirm it. His brother and heir presumptive Tupouto'a Lavaka was at the hospital when he died.

Domestic reactions 
A statement was due following a cabinet meeting the day after his death. Radio Australia reported that Tonga's largest religious organisation, the Free Wesleyan Church, said it would hold a prayer service at the queen mother's residence in Nukuʻalofa. Prime Minister Lord Tu'ivakano later made a national address calling on the people of Tonga to pray for the royal family and the country, according to Radio New Zealand.

International reactions 
Queen Elizabeth II sent a message of condolence saying that King Tupou was "a true statesman who served his country with distinction".
King Harald V sent a message of condolence to King Tupou VI, in which he expresses sympathy for the new King, his family and the people of Tonga.
Australian Prime Minister Julia Gillard said that King Tupou's death was the loss of "a great friend" to Australia and pointed to the change he led Tonga through as the "first truly democratic elections, held in November 2010, set the country on a new course."
New Zealand Prime Minister John Key said: "He believed that the monarchy was an instrument of change and can truly be seen as the architect of evolving democracy in Tonga. This will be his enduring legacy."
Maori King Tuheitia said: "He kura i tangihia, he maimai aroha" which means condolences to the Royal Family and the people of Tonga.
United States President Barack Obama said that King Tupou's death was the loss of "a friend" to the United States and the loss of "a visionary leader" to the people of Tonga.

Funeral 
Following the official announcement of the passing of King George Tupou V and giving the Proclamation of the new King, Tupou VI, His Majesty's Cabinet set up a Committee for the organization of the state funeral of the King. Lord Vaea became the chairman of the committee. The King's body arrived on 26 March 2012, then lay in state at the Royal Palace in Nuku'alofa for a day. The funeral, originally announced for 28 March 2012, was rescheduled to 27 March 2012.

Selected foreign dignitaries were invited by the committee to attend the funeral, including the Governor-General of Australia, Quentin Bryce, and the Governor-General of New Zealand, Jerry Mateparae. Royal guests at the ceremony included Prince Richard, Duke of Gloucester and Prince Hitachi of Japan and his wife, Princess Hitachi.

Honours

National 
 : Sovereign Knight Grand Cross with Collar of the Order of Pouono
 : Sovereign Knight Grand Cross of the Order of George Tupou I
 : Sovereign Knight Grand Cross with Collar of the Order of the Crown
 : 1st Sovereign Knight Grand Cross with Collar of the Order of Sālote Tupou III
 : 1st Sovereign Knight Grand Cross of the Order of Saint George
 : 1st Sovereign Knight Grand Cross of the Order of the Phoenix
 : 1st Sovereign Knight Grand Cross of the Order of the Royal House
 : 1st Sovereign Knight Grand Cross of the Royal Order of Oceania
 : Sovereign of the Royal Family Decoration of King George Tupou V
 : Sovereign Recipient of the Medal of Merit
 : Sovereign Recipient of the Red Cross Medal
 : Sovereign Recipient of the King Tāufaʻāhau Tupou IV Silver Jubilee Medal

Foreign
 : Officer of the Order of the Legion of Honour
  Bagrationi-Mukhrani Georgian Royal Family: Knight Grand Cross with Collar of the Royal Order of the Eagle of Georgia
 : Grand Cross of the Order of Merit of the Hungarian Republic
  Two Sicilian Royal Family: Knight Grand Cross of the Royal Order of Francis I
  Two Sicilian Royal Family: Recipient of the Gold Benemerenti Medal
 : Knight Grand Cordon of the Order of the Nine Gems
 : Knight Grand Cordon of the Order of Chula Chom Klao

Ancestry 
See the Tongan language page and ancestor's page ...

Family tree

References

External links 
 King George Tupou V interviewed by the BBC, 31 July 2008
 The New King of Tonga gallery
 King George Tupou V Passing out parade, Sandhurst, 1968

|-

1948 births
2012 deaths
Alumni of the University of Oxford
People educated at King's College, Auckland
Graduates of the Royal Military Academy Sandhurst
People educated at The Leys School
People from Tongatapu
Tongan monarchs
Deaths from cancer in Hong Kong
Grand Crosses of the Order of Merit of the Republic of Hungary (civil)
Officiers of the Légion d'honneur
George Tupou V
Knights Grand Cross of the Order of the Crown of Tonga
Foreign ministers of Tonga